Leonard George Millar (8 April 1926 – 18 April 1996) was an Australian rules footballer who played with St Kilda in the Victorian Football League (VFL).

Notes

External links 

1926 births
1996 deaths
Australian rules footballers from Victoria (Australia)
St Kilda Football Club players